Sri Sri Kalika Maharani Temple in  Bokaro in the state of Jharkhand, India is a Hindu temple at Chira Chas, built by Aashiyaan Estate Developers. The temple is spread over half an acre and is dedicated to Goddess Kali. The mini township of Kalika Vihar is named after this temple.

History
The construction of the temple began in July, 2010. It took less than 3 years to complete the entire structure. The temple was opened to public on July 14, 2012. The temple is situated at Kalika Vihar, Aashiyan Garden, Phase - 3, Chira Chas. Before the foundation was laid, a nine-day Ramayana recital was held, along with a religious 'Yagna'. The temple is famous in Jharkhand and its opening was covered by major newspapers. During excavation of the Foundation in the initial phase of construction, laborers found an Indian Cobra which is considered a good omen, symbolizing Lord Shiva. Legend has it, that Goddess Kali grants the wishes of those, who pray at this temple.

Dimensions
The temple is a two storeyed structure with a tall 'Stupa' which is over 90 feet tall. over 50 feet is breadth, the temple is over 160 feet long. The temple is based on a unique design, imitating a lotus flower with five petals. Each petal houses an entrance to the temple. The temple is designed on a pentagonal scheme and has five nodes in its superstructure.

Temple

The main temple houses statues of goddess Ma Kali.
The main temple of Kali is based on the first floor, while the basement (over 4000 square feet) would house a large prayer and Yagya hall. The idol is a beautiful representation of Kali in her Sita avatar. A small temple, dedicated to Lord Hanuman, is located at the entrance to the temple. Along with Sri Ram Mandir Temple, at Sector 1, this temple has risen to prominence in Bokaro.

Facilities
The basement prayer hall can be used for Hindu religious ceremonies and would protect the worshipers from the elements. The temple houses a seating area for devotees. A dedicated parking space is provided for the convenience of visitors.

Directions to the temple

To reach the temple, the devotees should travel towards Bokaro Hotel from Patharkata Chowk. Turn left towards Chinmaya School and turn right by Asha Lata Kendra. Devotees should continue on this road, crossing the Chira Chas bridge. One should then travel straight to Chira Chas school and then turn left. After traveling a distance of 30 feet, one should then turn right (by the board of Kalika Vihar Phase -3), and then enter the Aashiyana Garden/Kalika Vihar Phase - 3 campus where the temple is located.

Gallery

Pictorial timeline of construction

Temple

See also
 Rajrappa

References

External links

Hindu temples in Jharkhand